Stephen Michael Shalet  (born 26 April 1944) is an English endocrinologist, and a former professor at the University of Manchester.

Early life
He was born in Bedford, where his mother had been evacuated from London. His father was a GP in the East End of London, and serving as an army doctor. At the age of nine he moved to Stoke Newington. He attended Westminster City Grammar School. He studied medicine at the London Hospital, since 1990 the Royal London Hospital, qualifying in 1969.

Career
He moved to Manchester in 1974 as a research fellow, becoming a consultant four years later. He retired in 2005. He was on the Strategic Planning Committee of the European Society of Pediatric Endocrinology. He is a co-editor of the Oxford Textbook of Endocrinology and Diabetes.

Personal life
He now lives in rural Derbyshire, in the High Peak. His first wife Caroline (nee Goldin) died in 2002. He subsequently married Diana Greenfield in 2019. He has a son, Daniel and daughter, Rachael (aka Shashana).

See also
 Society for Endocrinology

References

External links
 Haemachromatosis Society

1944 births
Academics of the University of Manchester
Alumni of the London Hospital Medical College
British endocrinologists
Fellows of the Royal College of Physicians
People from Bedford
People from High Peak, Derbyshire
Living people